The swimming events at the 2006 Central American and Caribbean Games occurred July 17–22, 2006 at S.U. Pedro de Heredia Aquatic Complex in Cartagena, Colombia.

Participating countries
189 swimmers from 25 countries took part in the swimming events at the 2006 Central American and Caribbean Games (team size follows name):

Results

Men

Women

Medal standings

References

Swimming results main page from the website of the 2006 Central American and Caribbean Games website; retrieved 2009-06-29.

 
2006 Central American and Caribbean Games
2006 in swimming
2006